Thomas Hodgskin (12 December 1787 – 21 August 1869) was an English socialist writer on political economy, critic of capitalism and defender of free trade and early trade unions. In the late 19th and early 20th centuries, the term socialist included any opponent of capitalism, at the time defined as a construed political system built on privileges for the owners of capital.

Biography 

Hodgskin's father. who worked at the British Admiralty dock stores, enrolled him in the navy at the age of 12. Coming into conflict with the naval discipline of the time, Hodgskin was retired by the Navy at the age of 25. Publication of his Essay on Naval Discipline brought Hodgskin to the attention of radicals such as Francis Place. In 1815 Hodgskin travelled in France and Germany, experiences which he later documented in his Travels in the North of Germany. 
 
Entering the University of Edinburgh for study, Hodgskin later came to London and entered the utilitarian circle around Place, Jeremy Bentham and James Mill. With their support, he spent the next five years in a programme of travel and study around Europe which resulted inter alia in a second book, Travels in North Germany (1820). He married Eliza Hegewesch in Edinburgh in 1819.

In 1823, Hodgskin joined forces with Joseph Clinton Robertson in founding the Mechanics Magazine. In the October 1823 edition of the Mechanics Magazine, Hodgskin and Francis Place wrote a manifesto for a Mechanics Institute.

Despite his high profile in the agitated revolutionary times of the 1820s, he retreated into the realm of Whig journalism after the Reform Act 1832. Hodgskin had a family of seven children to support. He became an advocate of free trade and spent fifteen years writing for The Economist.

Legacy 

Hodgskin was a pioneer of anti-capitalism, individualist anarchism and libertarian socialism. His criticism of employers appropriation of the lion's share of the value produced by their employees went on to influence subsequent generations of socialists, including Karl Marx.

References

Further reading 
 Halévy, Élie (1903); Taylor, A. J. (trans.) (1956). Thomas Hodgskin. Paris. .
 Sallis, Edward (1971). The Social and Political Thought of Thomas Hodgskin 1787–1869. MA Social Studies Dissertation University of Newcastle upon Tyne.
 
 Stack, David (1998). Nature and Artifice: The Life and Thought of Thomas Hodgskin 1787–1869. Boydell & Brewer. . .

External links 

 
 Labour Defended against the Claims of Capital

1787 births
1869 deaths
19th-century  British economists
19th-century English male writers
19th-century English philosophers
Alumni of the University of Edinburgh
Anarchist theorists
Anarchist writers
British anti-capitalists
British deists
British social commentators
English anarchists
English male non-fiction writers
English political philosophers
English political writers
English sailors
English socialists
Free-market anarchists
Libertarian socialists
People from Chatham, Kent